Andela Antunović (born October 22, 2002) is a Montenegrin swimmer competing in the 100 meter freestyle at the 2020 Summer Olympics. She competed in the 100 meter and 200 meter freestyle at the 2019 World Aquatics Championships.

References 

Living people
2002 births
Montenegrin female swimmers
Swimmers at the 2020 Summer Olympics
Olympic swimmers of Montenegro
21st-century Montenegrin women